Dave Tough (born Springfield, Missouri) is an American multi-instrumentalist, producer, engineer, songwriter and music industry educator.  He is also a member of the band Xavier & Ophelia who released their debut album X&O in 2011.  Tough has released two solo albums, one in 1999 and one in 2005, and he has won the grand prize in the John Lennon Songwriting Contest twice, in 2009 in the country category, and in 2013 in the electronica category.  He has also written and produced songs for shows such as Hart of Dixie, Nashville, Hemlock Grove, and the Seth Rogen film Observe and Report. Tough has won two GMA Covenant Awards (the Canadian equivalent to the Dove Awards) for his work producing, engineering, and writing songs with guitar instrumentalist Sean Spicer.

Early life, education 
Dave Tough was born and raised in Springfield, Missouri. He attended the same high school as Brad Pitt, Kickapoo High. Tough developed an early interest in music, and in his youth started playing saxophone, later transitioning to drums, bass, piano and guitar.  While attending the University of North Texas in the mid-1990s, he performed with several bands in the Dallas area including serving as drummer for the R&B ensemble of Al "TNT" Bragg, and he worked as a disc jockey for jazz from May to August 1997 at KNTU 88.1 FM. He graduated from the University of North Texas in August 1998 with a BA in music and a focus on jazz and the jazz drum set.

Music career

1998–99: Music business career, I'm Right Here 
Tough worked at Capitol Records/EMI from July 1998 to June 1999.

After five years in Texas, he then moved to Los Angeles to work for a variety of music and entertainment companies.  He worked at BMG Music Publishing and did technology consulting for Warner Music Group. He attended Pepperdine University from 1999 to 2001 on a scholarship, graduating with a Master of Business Administration in April 2001. He also has an ADR certificate from Pepperdine School of Law.

After a recommendation from WEA CEO Dave Mount, he worked as a copyright coordinator at Warner/Chappell Music Publishing in Los Angeles.  While in Los Angeles he also studied under music engineers such as Bruce Swedien, Allen Sides, and Neil Citron, he has been a voting member of The Recording Academy.

2002–14:Teaching Career 
Tough has also served as a music business, recording, producing and songwriting professor since 2002.  He was on the list of "15 Outstanding Professors Every Audio Enthusiast Should Know at #11. Tough first began teaching music technology at a number of institutions in California, including UCLA.  He was an assistant professor in music technology and business at California State Polytechnic University, Pomona from August 2002 to August 2004.

Tough accepted a job offer in January 2005 to teach at Belmont University in Nashville.  From August 2005 to August 2006 he was teaching music technology at the University of North Alabama, before beginning to work exclusively at Belmont's Mike Curb College full-time. 
He was on the executive committee of the Audio Engineering Society in Nashville from 2005 to 2007.

2005–11: Gravity Always Wins, compilations 
His second solo album, Gravity Always Wins, was self-released in 2005. The album was recorded in 2004 at Steve Vai's Mothership Studios, with a focus on the sounds of 1980s new wave and art rock. Los Angeles producer and keyboardist Steven Leavitt co-produced the album along with Tough, and also arranged the strings. Other contributing musicians included guitarist Neil Citron (Steve Vai, Johnny Hiland), drummer Mitch Marine, and Jim Demain (Josh Rouse, Keith Urban). Indie-Music.com called the album "down-to-earth," and in a positive review stated "Tough's music doesn't sound too much like the stuff you hear all the time on the radio these days. Instead, tracks such as 'Photograph' and 'Never Gonna Change' borrow chunks of inspiration from 80s New Wave guitar rock. It's not all rock & roll from beginning to end, however, as this CD's title track utilizes a classical arrangement."

After Gravity Always Wins, Tough went on to release a number of digital compilations on iTunes, including the 2006–2007 Songs CD released in March 2008. He won the country category in the 2009 John Lennon Songwriting Contest for the song he co-wrote titled "Beatles Without John". He released his album Dave Tough – 2008–2010 in 2011. In the 2011 International Songwriting Competition, he was a finalist with the song "Nothing Sweet About Alabama," and a semi-finalist with the song "Six Billion Lonely People," both of which he co-wrote.

2008–14: Dave Tough Productions 
Tough is owner and operator of Dave Tough Productions, a company which provides a recording studio and music production services to both national and international clients.

Both at his studio and elsewhere, Tough has produced, engineered and written songs for hundreds of both signed and independent artists in a variety of genres. Much of his production and mastering work he does over the internet. He was featured in Music Connection magazine in the summer of 2009 as producer and engineer for the Frog Eye Jug Band. Some of the clients he has produced under Dave Tough Productions include The Lost Trailers, Cindy Alter from the band Clout, and Danny Gottlieb. Tough has had several recordings of his songs by independent artists.

2009–14: Xavier and Ophelia 

In 2009 Tough founded the pop, rock, and electronica group Xavier and Ophelia with vocalist and songwriter DeAnna Moore. The duo first met in 2009 over Myspace, when Tough was searching for vocalists for a demo. After meeting in person they discovered a shared fascination with older jazz standards and artists such as Fiona Apple, Goldfrapp and Edie Brickell. They soon formed Xavier & Ophelia, also going by the moniker X&O. Moore contributes vocals while Tough handles production and instrumentals. Both members contribute to the songwriting process, and they began writing songs that variously integrated the genres of synth-pop, electronica, pop, alternative rock, and indie rock. Early on the band was based in Cane Ridge, Tennessee and Antioch, Tennessee.

The duo released their first album, Xavier & Ophelia, on April 1, 2011.  The album met with a largely positive reception among critics. Music News Nashville praised Tough's production, stating "techno beats, computerized sounds, live instruments and lovely, layered vocals mixed together put a unique stamp on their clean productions." For a time the album's track "Six Billion Lonely People" was in rotation on the BBS Radio 24-hour music station. At the 2011 International Songwriting Competition, the band was a semi-finalist with "Six Billion Lonely People, and the song was a finalist in the 2012 Songdoor Songwriting Competition as well. "Last Recorded Summer," a pop song on the album, was nominated in the Indie International Songwriting Contest and was also a finalist in the UK Songwriting Competition.

Their second album, I Hate Birds, was self-released on December 18, 2012, and several tracks went on to win or be nominated for awards. "Falling Down" won the Grand Prize at the John Lennon Songwriting Contest in the electronic category, and two more songs placed in the Indie International Songwriting Contest in spring 2013: "I Hate Birds" in the rock category and "Made of Stars" in the pop category.

The band's music has been placed in movies, television, and commercials. "Passing Train" was featured in multiple episodes of Alaska Gold Diggers, and in late 2013 their song "Heartbeat" was featured on the television show Twisted. Xavier and Ophelia periodically performs live as a duo or with a backing band, with Tough switching between instruments such as guitar and keyboards. They regularly perform at The Bluebird Cafe in Nashville.

2010–18: Film placements 
Tough has had a number of his songs placed in television shows on major networks. In August 2010 his song "Vegas" was featured in The CW series Plain Jane, and later that year his song "Constantly Falling" was featured in Seth Rogen's feature film Observe and Report. In January 2012, his songs " Let's Get Crazy," "Vegas," and "Pretty Mama" placed in episodes 102–107 of the CW reality television series Remodel.  The show ended up using ten of his songs that year.  Later in 2012, the CBS Sports Network featured his song "Brownsville," co-written with Bill Dilugi, in a bull riding scene, and late 2012 he produced, engineered, wrote, and co-wrote nine songs for the television series Hart of Dixie. The episodes include "Pilot," "Padres and Pariahs," "In Havoc and Heat," "The Pirate & The Practice," "Aliens and Alias," and "The Big Day."

In 2012–2013 he produced a song for the ABC series This Moment, a song he produced and co-wrote with Justin Busch, was then used as the theme song for a cycling DVD by Endurance Films in February 2013. In late 2013 his song "Hillbilly Hollywood" was used on the show Nashville, his song "Pretty Mama" appeared in the ABC movie Christmas Bounty, and his songs "Nothing Sweet About Alabama" and "Passing Train" appeared in Alaska Gold Diggers. Also, a song he co-wrote and produced titled "Pretty Mama (So Many Girls)" was used in episode 102 of the Netflix show Hemlock Grove. In the summer of 2014, he produced and engineered an original track titled "Close" for the documentary Cuddle, directed by Jason O'Brien.

In 2016, two of Tough's songs "Because of You" and "Sweet Remedy" received prominent features in the movie Return of the Prodigal Son.  Also, his song "Gonna Find My Way to You" was placed into the introduction of the Hallmark Channel movie Summer Love.

In 2017 Tough's song "I Love Em All" was placed in the film Thumper which debuted at the Tribeca Film Festival.

2012–18: Recent years 
Tough was on the faculty at the GRAMMY Camp hosted in Nashville by The Recording Academy in June 2012 and June 2014. He is a member of The College Music Society, National Academy of Recording Arts & Sciences, American Society of Composers, Authors and Publishers, and has served on the Music and Entertainment Industry Educators Association Board.

The song he co-wrote titled "Tell Ya That I Love Ya" was chosen as a semi-finalist in the International Songwriting Competition of 2013.

In 2017 Tough won his second Dove/GMA award for producing/engineering the Instrumental Song of the Year "Rise Again."

He also started his own YouTube show entitled The Producer's Room with Dave Tough.

As of May 2018, Dave Tough is based in Nashville, Tennessee where he continues to work on new music in his Nashville studio. Tough simultaneously is a music industry educator at Belmont University, and continues to produce/write other projects as well. He continues to publish scholarly material on the music industry. Tough has been known to use Pro Tools, Cubase, Nuendo, Digital Performer, Sibelius, and the scorewriting program Finale.

Personal life 
In 2007 he successfully finished a round of cancer treatment.

Publishing history 
 Tough, D. (Fall 1997). "Show & Tell" in Process Magazine
 Tough, D. (2005) "Beautiful Dreamer: Brian Wilson and the Story of SMILE" in Journal of the Music & Entertainment Educators Association (Vol. 5, No. 1)
 Tough, D. (2010). "Shaping Audio Engineering Curriculum: An Expert Panel's View of the Future." AES Convention.
 Tough, D. (2010). "Shaping Future Audio Engineering Curricula: An Expert Panel's View." Music and Entertainment Industry Educators Association (MEIEA) Journal.
 Tough, D. (2010). Play it Again: Cover Songs in Popular Music (April 1, 2010, Ashgate) – authored chapter
 Tough, D. (2012). "A Focus on Robert Gagne's Instruction Theories: Application to Teaching Audio Engineering." Music and Entertainment Industry Educators Association (MEIEA) Journal.
 Tough, D. (2013). "Teaching Modern Production and Songwriting Techniques: What Makes a Hit Song?" Music and Entertainment Industry Educators Association (MEIEA) Journal.

Discography

Solo Material 
Albums

Singles

With X and O 

Albums

Singles

Production credits

Awards and nominations

Further reading 
 Tough, Dave (August 30, 2010). "License to Earn". eMusician.com
 Dave Tough at Allmusic.com

See also 
 Xavier and Ophelia

References

External links 
 DaveTough.com
 XandOMusic.com
 Dave Tough on Twitter
 Dave Tough on Soundcloud

Year of birth missing (living people)
Living people
Record producers from Missouri
American rock songwriters
Musicians from Springfield, Missouri
20th-century American musicians
21st-century American musicians